The 9th Macondo Awards ceremony, presented by the Colombian Academy of Cinematography Arts and Sciences, honored the best audiovisual productions of 2021. It took place on December 6, 2021, at the Cinemateca Distrital in Bogotá. The ceremony awarded 18 categories.

The film Monos won the award for Best Film.

Winners and nominees

See also

 List of Colombian films
 Macondo Awards
 2021 in film

References

External links
9th Macondo Awards at IMDb
9th Macondo Awards at Filmaffinity

2021 film awards
2021 in Colombia